Norton in Hales is a village and parish in Shropshire, England.

It lies on the A53 between the town of Market Drayton and Woore, Shropshire's most northeasterly village and parish.

Staffordshire is to the east of the parish and Cheshire to the west. Also within the parish is the village of Betton and hamlet of Ridgwardine.

The parish church is Saint Chad's. Also within the village are Norton in Hales Church of England Primary School, the Hind's Head Inn, and a large playing field.

The monument to Frances, Lady Cotton (d. 1606) in St Chad's was designed by Inigo Jones around the year 1611. Her husband Rowland Cotton, who commissioned the tomb, was associated with the court of Prince Henry, as was Jones. The tomb is the earliest known work of Inigo Jones. 

Tunstall Hall is a Grade II* listed building, built in about 1732, formerly a girls' school, and now a residential home offering specialist care in dementia.

The engineer Samuel Owen, who later emigrated to Sweden where he became an industrialist, was born at Norton in 1774.

See also
Listed buildings in Norton in Hales

References

External links

Villages in Shropshire
Civil parishes in Shropshire